
All times shown are US EDT.

Pool play

Pool A

Hawaii 7, Pennsylvania 1

Florida 7, Iowa 3

Florida 3, Pennsylvania 1

Hawaii 7, Iowa 3

Hawaii 10, Florida 0

Pennsylvania 15, Iowa 0

Pool B

Louisiana 3, Maine 2

California 7, Kentucky 2

Louisiana 9, Kentucky 8

California 7, Maine 3

Maine 3, Kentucky 2

California 9, Louisiana 3

Pool C

Guam 6, Russia 2

Canada 2, Mexico 0

Guam 5, Canada 0

Mexico 7, Russia 0

Canada 2, Russia 1

Guam 5, Mexico 3

Pool D

Japan 3, Saudi Arabia 0

Curaçao 5, Venezuela 4

Japan 9, Curaçao 0

Japan 7, Venezuela 4

Curaçao 3, Saudi Arabia 0

Venezuela 4, Saudi Arabia 0

Elimination round

Semifinals

Japan 11, Canada 0

Curaçao 16, Guam 1

California 6, Florida 2

Hawaii 2, Louisiana 0

United States Championship

Hawaii 6, California 1

International Championship

Curaçao 2, Japan 0

Consolation Game

California 5, Japan 4

Championship game

Hawaii 7, Curaçao 6

External links
Full schedule from littleleague.org

2005 Little League World Series